Hydrogen peroxide is a chemical compound with the formula . In its pure form, it is a very pale blue liquid that is slightly more viscous than water. It is used as an oxidizer, bleaching agent, and antiseptic, usually as a dilute solution (3%–6% by weight) in water for consumer use, and in higher concentrations for industrial use. Concentrated hydrogen peroxide, or "high-test peroxide", decomposes explosively when heated and has been used as a propellant in rocketry.

Hydrogen peroxide is a reactive oxygen species and the simplest peroxide, a compound having an oxygen–oxygen single bond. It decomposes slowly into water and elemental oxygen when exposed to light, and rapidly in the presence of organic or reactive compounds. It is typically stored with a stabilizer in a weakly acidic solution in a dark bottle to block light. Hydrogen peroxide is found in biological systems including the human body. Enzymes that use or decompose hydrogen peroxide are classified as peroxidases.

Properties 
The boiling point of  has been extrapolated as being , approximately  higher than water. In practice, hydrogen peroxide will undergo potentially explosive thermal decomposition if heated to this temperature. It may be safely distilled at lower temperatures under reduced pressure.

Structure 

Hydrogen peroxide is a nonplanar molecule with (twisted) C2 symmetry; this was first shown by Paul-Antoine Giguère in 1950 using infrared spectroscopy. Although the O−O bond is a single bond, the molecule has a relatively high rotational barrier of 386 cm−1 (4.62 kJ/mol) for rotation between enantiomers via the trans configuration, and 2460 cm−1 (29.4 kJ/mol) via the cis configuration. These barriers are proposed to be due to repulsion between the lone pairs of the adjacent oxygen atoms and dipolar effects between the two O–H bonds. For comparison, the rotational barrier for ethane is 1040 cm−1 (12.4 kJ/mol).

The approximately 100° dihedral angle between the two O–H bonds makes the molecule chiral. It is the smallest and simplest molecule to exhibit enantiomerism. It has been proposed that the enantiospecific interactions of one rather than the other may have led to amplification of one enantiomeric form of ribonucleic acids and therefore an origin of homochirality in an RNA world.

The molecular structures of gaseous and crystalline  are significantly different. This difference is attributed to the effects of hydrogen bonding, which is absent in the gaseous state.

Aqueous solutions 
In aqueous solutions, hydrogen peroxide differs from the pure substance due to the effects of hydrogen bonding between water and hydrogen peroxide molecules. Hydrogen peroxide and water form a eutectic mixture, exhibiting freezing-point depression down as low as -56 °C; pure water has a freezing point of 0 °C and pure hydrogen peroxide of -0.43 °C. The boiling point of the same mixtures is also depressed in relation with the mean of both boiling points (125.1 °C). It occurs at 114 °C. This boiling point is 14 °C greater than that of pure water and 36.2 °C less than that of pure hydrogen peroxide.

Comparison with analogues 
Hydrogen peroxide has several structural analogues with  bonding arrangements (water also shown for comparison). It has the highest (theoretical) boiling point of this series (X = O, S, N, P). Its melting point is also fairly high, being comparable to that of hydrazine and water, with only hydroxylamine crystallising significantly more readily, indicative of particularly strong hydrogen bonding. Diphosphane and hydrogen disulfide exhibit only weak hydrogen bonding and have little chemical similarity to hydrogen peroxide. Structurally, the analogues all adopt similar skewed structures, due to repulsion between adjacent lone pairs.

Discovery 
Alexander von Humboldt is sometimes said to have been the first to report the first synthetic peroxide, barium peroxide, in 1799 as a by-product of his attempts to decompose air, although this is disputed due to von Humboldt's ambiguous wording. Today, the term "oxygenated water" may appear on retail packaging referring to mixtures containing either water and hydrogen peroxide or water and dissolved oxygen. This could cause personal injury if the difference is not properly understood by the user.

An improved version of Thénard's process used hydrochloric acid, followed by addition of sulfuric acid to precipitate the barium sulfate byproduct. This process was used from the end of the 19th century until the middle of the 20th century.

The bleaching effect of peroxides and their salts on natural dyes had been known since Thénard's experiments in the 1820s, but early attempts of industrial production of peroxides failed. The first plant producing hydrogen peroxide was built in 1873 in Berlin. The discovery of the synthesis of hydrogen peroxide by electrolysis with sulfuric acid introduced the more efficient electrochemical method. It was first commercialized in 1908 in Weißenstein, Carinthia, Austria. The anthraquinone process, which is still used, was developed during the 1930s by the German chemical manufacturer IG Farben in Ludwigshafen. The increased demand and improvements in the synthesis methods resulted in the rise of the annual production of hydrogen peroxide from 35,000 tonnes in 1950, to over 100,000 tonnes in 1960, to 300,000 tonnes by 1970; by 1998 it reached 2.7 million tonnes.

Early attempts failed to produce neat hydrogen peroxide. Anhydrous hydrogen peroxide was first obtained by vacuum distillation.

Determination of the molecular structure of hydrogen peroxide proved to be very difficult. In 1934, the English mathematical physicist William Penney and the Scottish physicist Gordon Sutherland proposed a molecular structure for hydrogen peroxide that was very similar to the presently accepted one.

Previously, hydrogen peroxide was prepared industrially by hydrolysis of ammonium persulfate:
[NH4]2S2O8 + 2 H2O -> 2 [NH4]HSO4 + H2O2
which was itself obtained by the electrolysis of a solution of ammonium bisulfate in sulfuric acid:
2 [NH4]HSO4 -> [NH4]2S2O8 + H2

Production 

Today, hydrogen peroxide is manufactured almost exclusively by the anthraquinone process, which was originally developed by BASF in 1939. It begins with the reduction of an anthraquinone (such as 2-ethylanthraquinone or the 2-amyl derivative) to the corresponding anthrahydroquinone, typically by hydrogenation on a palladium catalyst. In the presence of oxygen, the anthrahydroquinone then undergoes autoxidation: the labile hydrogen atoms of the hydroxy groups transfer to the oxygen molecule, to give hydrogen peroxide and regenerating the anthraquinone. Most commercial processes achieve oxidation by bubbling compressed air through a solution of the anthrahydroquinone, with the hydrogen peroxide then extracted from the solution and the anthraquinone recycled back for successive cycles of hydrogenation and oxidation.

The net reaction for the anthraquinone-catalyzed process is :

The economics of the process depend heavily on effective recycling of the extraction solvents, the hydrogenation catalyst and the expensive quinone.

Other sources 
Small, but detectable, amounts of hydrogen peroxide can be formed by several methods. Small amounts are formed by electrolysis of dilute acid around the cathode where hydrogen evolves if oxygen is bubbled around it. It is also produced by exposing water to ultraviolet rays from a mercury lamp, or an electric arc while confining it in a UV transparent vessel (e.g. quartz). It is detectable in ice water after burning a hydrogen gas stream aimed towards it and is also detectable on floating ice. Rapidly cooling humid air blown through an approximately 2,000 °C spark gap results in detectable amounts.

A commercially viable process to produce hydrogen peroxide directly from the environment has been of interest for many years. Efficient direct synthesis is difficult to achieve, as the reaction of hydrogen with oxygen thermodynamically favours production of water. Systems for direct synthesis have been developed, most of which employ finely dispersed metal catalysts similar to those used for hydrogenation of organic substrates. One economic obstacle has been that direct processes give a dilute solution uneconomic for transportation. None of these has yet reached a point where it can be used for industrial-scale synthesis.

Availability 
Hydrogen peroxide is most commonly available as a solution in water. For consumers, it is usually available from pharmacies at 3 and 6 wt% concentrations. The concentrations are sometimes described in terms of the volume of oxygen gas generated; one milliliter of a 20-volume solution generates twenty milliliters of oxygen gas when completely decomposed. For laboratory use, 30 wt% solutions are most common. Commercial grades from 70% to 98% are also available, but due to the potential of solutions of more than 68% hydrogen peroxide to be converted entirely to steam and oxygen (with the temperature of the steam increasing as the concentration increases above 68%) these grades are potentially far more hazardous and require special care in dedicated storage areas. Buyers must typically allow inspection by commercial manufacturers.

In that year, bulk 30%  sold for around 0.54 USD/kg, equivalent to US$1.50/kg (US$0.68/lb) on a "100% basis".

Natural occurrence 
Hydrogen peroxide occurs in surface water, in groundwater, and in the atmosphere. It forms upon illumination or natural catalytic action by substances contained in water. Sea water contains 0.5 to 14 μg/L of hydrogen peroxide, and freshwater contains 1 to 30 μg/L. Concentrations in air are about 0.4 to 4 μg/m3, varying over several orders of magnitude depending in conditions such as season, altitude, daylight and water vapor content. In rural nighttime air it is less than 0.014 μg/m3, and in moderate photochemical smog it is 14 to 42 μg/m3.

Reactions

Decomposition 
Hydrogen peroxide decomposes to form water and oxygen with a ΔHo of –2884.5 kJ/kg and a ΔS of 70.5 J/(mol·K):

2 H2O2 -> 2 H2O + O2

The rate of decomposition increases with rise in temperature, concentration, and pH ( being unstable under alkaline conditions), with cool, dilute, and acidic solutions showing the best stability. Decomposition is catalysed by various redox-active ions or compounds, including most transition metals and their compounds (e.g. manganese dioxide, silver, and platinum). Non-metallic catalysts include potassium iodide (KI), which reacts particularly rapidly and forms the basis of the elephant toothpaste demonstration. Hydrogen peroxide can also be decomposed biologically by the enzyme catalase. The decomposition of hydrogen peroxide liberates oxygen and heat; this can be dangerous, as spilling high-concentration hydrogen peroxide on a flammable substance can cause an immediate fire.

Redox reactions 
The redox properties of hydrogen peroxide depend on pH as acidic conditions exacerbate the power of oxidizing agents and basic conditions exacerbate the power of reducing agents. As hydrogen peroxide exhibits ambivalent redox properties, being simultaneously an oxidizer or a reductant, its redox behavior immediately depends on pH.

In acidic solutions,  is a powerful oxidizer, stronger than chlorine, chlorine dioxide, and potassium permanganate. When used for cleaning laboratory glassware, a solution of hydrogen peroxide and sulfuric acid is referred to as Piranha solution.

 is a source of hydroxyl radicals, which are highly reactive.

2 Fe^2+_{(aq)}{} + H2O2 + 2 H+_{(aq)} -> 2 Fe^3+_{(aq)}{} + 2 H2O_{(l)}

and sulfite is oxidized to sulfate.

2 MnO4- + 5 H2O2 + 6 H+ -> 2 Mn^2+ + 8 H2O + 5 O2

In basic solutions, hydrogen peroxide is a strong reductant and can reduce a variety of inorganic ions. When  acts as a reducing agent, oxygen gas is also produced. For example, hydrogen peroxide will reduce sodium hypochlorite and potassium permanganate, which is a convenient method for preparing oxygen in the laboratory:
NaOCl + H2O2 -> O2 + NaCl + H2O
2 KMnO4 + 3 H2O2 -> 2 MnO2 + 2 KOH + 2 H2O + 3 O2

Organic reactions 
Hydrogen peroxide is frequently used as an oxidizing agent.  Illustrative is oxidation of thioethers to sulfoxides:
Ph-S-CH3 + H2O2 -> Ph-S(O)-CH3 + H2O

Alkaline hydrogen peroxide is used for epoxidation of electron-deficient alkenes such as acrylic acid derivatives, and for the oxidation of alkylboranes to alcohols, the second step of hydroboration-oxidation. It is also the principal reagent in the Dakin oxidation process.

Precursor to other peroxide compounds 
Hydrogen peroxide is a weak acid, forming hydroperoxide or peroxide salts with many metals.

It also converts metal oxides into the corresponding peroxides. For example, upon treatment with hydrogen peroxide, chromic acid ( and ) forms a blue peroxide .

This kind of reaction is used industrially to produce peroxoanions. For example, reaction with borax leads to sodium perborate, a bleach used in laundry detergents:
Na2B4O7 + 4 H2O2 + 2 NaOH -> 2 Na2B2O4(OH)4 + H2O

 converts carboxylic acids into peroxy acids, which are themselves used as oxidizing agents. Hydrogen peroxide reacts with acetone to form acetone peroxide and with ozone to form trioxidane. Hydrogen peroxide forms stable adducts with urea (Hydrogen peroxide - urea), sodium carbonate (sodium percarbonate) and other compounds.

Hydrogen peroxide is both an oxidizing agent and reducing agent. The oxidation of hydrogen peroxide by sodium hypochlorite yields singlet oxygen. The net reaction of a ferric ion with hydrogen peroxide is a ferrous ion and oxygen. This proceeds via single electron oxidation and hydroxyl radicals. This is used in some organic chemistry oxidations, e.g. in the Fenton's reagent. Only catalytic quantities of iron ion is needed since peroxide also oxidizes ferrous to ferric ion. The net reaction of hydrogen peroxide and permanganate or manganese dioxide is manganous ion; however, until the peroxide is spent some manganese ions are reoxidized to make the reaction catalytic. This forms the basis for common monopropellant rockets.

Biological function 

Hydrogen peroxide is formed in humans and other animals as a short-lived product in biochemical processes and is toxic to cells. The toxicity is due to oxidation of proteins, membrane lipids and DNA by the peroxide ions. The class of biological enzymes called superoxide dismutase (SOD) is developed in nearly all living cells as an important antioxidant agent. They promote the disproportionation of superoxide into oxygen and hydrogen peroxide, which is then rapidly decomposed by the enzyme catalase to oxygen and water.

2 O2- + 2 H+ -> O2 + H2O2
2 H2O2 -> O2 + 2 H2O

Peroxisomes are organelles found in virtually all eukaryotic cells. They are involved in the catabolism of very long chain fatty acids, branched chain fatty acids, D-amino acids, polyamines, and biosynthesis of plasmalogens, ether phospholipids critical for the normal function of mammalian brains and lungs. Upon oxidation, they produce hydrogen peroxide in the following process catalyzed by flavin adenine dinucleotide (FAD):

 R-CH2-CH2-CO-SCoA + O2 ->[\ce{FAD}] R-CH=CH-CO-SCoA + H2O2

Catalase, another peroxisomal enzyme, uses this  to oxidize other substrates, including phenols, formic acid, formaldehyde, and alcohol, by means of a peroxidation reaction:
H2O2 + R'H2 -> R' + 2 H2O
thus eliminating the poisonous hydrogen peroxide in the process.

This reaction is important in liver and kidney cells, where the peroxisomes neutralize various toxic substances that enter the blood. Some of the ethanol humans drink is oxidized to acetaldehyde in this way. In addition, when excess  accumulates in the cell, catalase converts it to  through this reaction:
 H2O2 ->[\ce{CAT}] {1/2O2} + H2O

Another origin of hydrogen peroxide is the degradation of adenosine monophosphate which yields hypoxanthine. Hypoxanthine is then oxidatively catabolized first to xanthine and then to uric acid, and the reaction is catalyzed by the enzyme xanthine oxidase:

The degradation of guanosine monophosphate yields xanthine as an intermediate product which is then converted in the same way to uric acid with the formation of hydrogen peroxide.

Eggs of sea urchin, shortly after fertilization by a sperm, produce hydrogen peroxide. It is then quickly dissociated to HO• radicals. The radicals serve as initiator of radical polymerization, which surrounds the eggs with a protective layer of polymer.

The bombardier beetle has a device which allows it to shoot corrosive and foul-smelling bubbles at its enemies. The beetle produces and stores hydroquinone and hydrogen peroxide, in two separate reservoirs in the rear tip of its abdomen. When threatened, the beetle contracts muscles that force the two reactants through valved tubes into a mixing chamber containing water and a mixture of catalytic enzymes. When combined, the reactants undergo a violent exothermic chemical reaction, raising the temperature to near the boiling point of water. The boiling, foul-smelling liquid partially becomes a gas (flash evaporation) and is expelled through an outlet valve with a loud popping sound.

Hydrogen peroxide is a signaling molecule of plant defense against pathogens.

Hydrogen peroxide has roles as a signalling molecule in the regulation of a wide variety of biological processes. The compound is a major factor implicated in the free-radical theory of aging, based on how readily hydrogen peroxide can decompose into a hydroxyl radical and how superoxide radical byproducts of cellular metabolism can react with ambient water to form hydrogen peroxide. These hydroxyl radicals in turn readily react with and damage vital cellular components, especially those of the mitochondria. At least one study has also tried to link hydrogen peroxide production to cancer. These studies have frequently been quoted in fraudulent treatment claims.

The amount of hydrogen peroxide in biological systems can be assayed using a fluorometric assay.

Uses

Bleaching 
About 60% of the world's production of hydrogen peroxide is used for pulp- and paper-bleaching. The second major industrial application is the manufacture of sodium percarbonate and sodium perborate, which are used as mild bleaches in laundry detergents. Sodium percarbonate, which is an adduct of sodium carbonate and hydrogen peroxide, is the active ingredient in such laundry products as OxiClean and Tide laundry detergent.
It has also been used as a flour bleaching agent and a tooth whitening agent.

Production of organic compounds 
It is used in the production of various organic peroxides with dibenzoyl peroxide being a high volume example. Peroxy acids, such as peracetic acid and meta-chloroperoxybenzoic acid also are produced using hydrogen peroxide. Hydrogen peroxide has been used for creating organic peroxide-based explosives, such as acetone peroxide. It is used as an initiator in polymerizations.

Sewage treatment 
Hydrogen peroxide is used in certain waste-water treatment processes to remove organic impurities. In advanced oxidation processing, the Fenton reaction gives the highly reactive hydroxyl radical (•OH). This degrades organic compounds, including those that are ordinarily robust, such as aromatic or halogenated compounds. It can also oxidize sulfur-based compounds present in the waste; which is beneficial as it generally reduces their odour.

Disinfectant 
Hydrogen peroxide may be used for the sterilization of various surfaces, including surgical tools, and may be deployed as a vapour (VHP) for room sterilization.  demonstrates broad-spectrum efficacy against viruses, bacteria, yeasts, and bacterial spores. In general, greater activity is seen against Gram-positive than Gram-negative bacteria; however, the presence of catalase or other peroxidases in these organisms may increase tolerance in the presence of lower concentrations. Lower levels of concentration (3%) will work against most spores; higher concentrations (7 to 30%) and longer contact times will improve sporicidal activity.

Hydrogen peroxide is seen as an environmentally safe alternative to chlorine-based bleaches, as it degrades to form oxygen and water and it is generally recognized as safe as an antimicrobial agent by the U.S. Food and Drug Administration (FDA).

Propellant 

High-concentration  is referred to as "high-test peroxide" (HTP). It can be used either as a monopropellant (not mixed with fuel) or as the oxidizer component of a bipropellant rocket. Use as a monopropellant takes advantage of the decomposition of 70–98% concentration hydrogen peroxide into steam and oxygen. Peroxide was the first major monopropellant adopted for use in rocket applications. Hydrazine eventually replaced hydrogen-peroxide monopropellant thruster applications primarily because of a 25% increase in the vacuum specific impulse. Hydrazine (toxic) and hydrogen peroxide (less-toxic [ACGIH TLV 0.01 and 1 ppm respectively]) are the only two monopropellants (other than cold gases) to have been widely adopted and utilized for propulsion and power applications. The Bell Rocket Belt, reaction control systems for X-1, X-15, Centaur, Mercury, Little Joe, as well as the turbo-pump gas generators for X-1, X-15, Jupiter, Redstone and Viking used hydrogen peroxide as a monopropellant.

As a bipropellant,  is decomposed to burn a fuel as an oxidizer. Specific impulses as high as 350 s (3.5 kN·s/kg) can be achieved, depending on the fuel. Peroxide used as an oxidizer gives a somewhat lower Isp than liquid oxygen, but is dense, storable, non-cryogenic and can be more easily used to drive gas turbines to give high pressures using an efficient closed cycle. It may also be used for regenerative cooling of rocket engines. Peroxide was used very successfully as an oxidizer in World War II German rocket motors (e.g. T-Stoff, containing oxyquinoline stabilizer, for both the Walter HWK 109-500 Starthilfe RATO externally podded monopropellant booster system, and for the Walter HWK 109-509 rocket motor series used for the Me 163B), most often used with C-Stoff in a self-igniting hypergolic combination, and for the low-cost British Black Knight and Black Arrow launchers. Presently, HTP is used on ILR-33 AMBER and Nucleus suborbital rockets. 

In the 1940s and 1950s, the Hellmuth Walter KG–conceived turbine used hydrogen peroxide for use in submarines while submerged; it was found to be too noisy and require too much maintenance compared to diesel-electric power systems. Some torpedoes used hydrogen peroxide as oxidizer or propellant. Operator error in the use of hydrogen-peroxide torpedoes was named as possible causes for the sinking of HMS Sidon and the Russian submarine Kursk. SAAB Underwater Systems is manufacturing the Torpedo 2000. This torpedo, used by the Swedish Navy, is powered by a piston engine propelled by HTP as an oxidizer and kerosene as a fuel in a bipropellant system.

Household use

Hydrogen peroxide has various domestic uses, primarily as a cleaning and disinfecting agent.

Hair bleaching
Diluted  (between 1.9% and 12%) mixed with aqueous ammonia has been used to bleach human hair. The chemical's bleaching property lends its name to the phrase "peroxide blonde".
Hydrogen peroxide is also used for tooth whitening. It may be found in most whitening toothpastes. Hydrogen peroxide has shown positive results involving teeth lightness and chroma shade parameters. It works by oxidizing colored pigments onto the enamel where the shade of the tooth may become lighter. Hydrogen peroxide may be mixed with baking soda and salt to make a homemade toothpaste.

Removal of blood stains
Hydrogen peroxide reacts with blood as a bleaching agent, and so if a blood stain is fresh, or not too old, liberal application of hydrogen peroxide, if necessary in more than single application, will bleach the stain fully out. After about two minutes of the application, the blood should be firmly blotted out.

Acne treatment
Hydrogen peroxide may be used to treat acne, although benzoyl peroxide is a more common treatment.

Niche uses 

Glow sticks
Hydrogen peroxide reacts with certain di-esters, such as phenyl oxalate ester (cyalume), to produce chemiluminescence; this application is most commonly encountered in the form of glow sticks.

Horticulture
Some horticulturalists and users of hydroponics advocate the use of weak hydrogen peroxide solution in watering solutions. Its spontaneous decomposition releases oxygen that enhances a plant's root development and helps to treat root rot (cellular root death due to lack of oxygen) and a variety of other pests.

For general watering concentrations around 0.1% is in use and this can be increased up to one percent for anti-fungal actions. Tests show that plant foliage can safely tolerate concentrations up to 3%.

Fishkeeping
Hydrogen peroxide is used in aquaculture for controlling mortality caused by various microbes. In 2019, the U.S. FDA approved it for control of Saprolegniasis in all coldwater finfish and all fingerling and adult coolwater and warmwater finfish, for control of external columnaris disease in warm-water finfish, and for control of Gyrodactylus spp. in freshwater-reared salmonids. Laboratory tests conducted by fish culturists have demonstrated that common household hydrogen peroxide may be used safely to provide oxygen for small fish. The hydrogen peroxide releases oxygen by decomposition when it is exposed to catalysts such as manganese dioxide.

Removing yellowing from aged plastics
Hydrogen peroxide may be used in combination with a UV-light source to remove yellowing from white or light grey acrylonitrile butadiene styrene (ABS) plastics to partially or fully restore the original color. In the retrocomputing scene, this process is commonly referred to as retr0bright.

Safety 

Regulations vary, but low concentrations, such as 5%, are widely available and legal to buy for medical use. Most over-the-counter peroxide solutions are not suitable for ingestion. Higher concentrations may be considered hazardous and typically are accompanied by a safety data sheet (SDS). In high concentrations, hydrogen peroxide is an aggressive oxidizer and will corrode many materials, including human skin. In the presence of a reducing agent, high concentrations of  will react violently.
While concentrations up to 35% produce only "white" oxygen bubbles in the skin (and some biting pain) that disappear with the blood within 30-45 minutes concentrations of 98% dissolve paper. However concentrations as low as 3% can be dangerous for the eye because of oxygen evolution within the eye.

High-concentration hydrogen peroxide streams, typically above 40%, should be considered hazardous due to concentrated hydrogen peroxide's meeting the definition of a DOT oxidizer according to U.S. regulations, if released into the environment.

Hydrogen peroxide should be stored in a cool, dry, well-ventilated area and away from any flammable or combustible substances. It should be stored in a container composed of non-reactive materials such as stainless steel or glass (other materials including some plastics and aluminium alloys may also be suitable). Because it breaks down quickly when exposed to light, it should be stored in an opaque container, and pharmaceutical formulations typically come in brown bottles that block light.

Hydrogen peroxide, either in pure or diluted form, may pose several risks, the main one being that it forms explosive mixtures upon contact with organic compounds. Distillation of hydrogen peroxide at normal pressures is highly dangerous. It is also corrosive, especially when concentrated, but even domestic-strength solutions may cause irritation to the eyes, mucous membranes, and skin. Swallowing hydrogen peroxide solutions is particularly dangerous, as decomposition in the stomach releases large quantities of gas (ten times the volume of a 3% solution), leading to internal bloating. Inhaling over 10% can cause severe pulmonary irritation.

With a significant vapour pressure (1.2 kPa at 50 °C), hydrogen-peroxide vapour is potentially hazardous. According to U.S. NIOSH, the immediately dangerous to life and health (IDLH) limit is only 75 ppm. The U.S. Occupational Safety and Health Administration (OSHA) has established a permissible exposure limit of 1.0 ppm calculated as an 8-hour time-weighted average (29 CFR 1910.1000, Table Z-1). Hydrogen peroxide also has been classified by the American Conference of Governmental Industrial Hygienists (ACGIH) as a "known animal carcinogen, with unknown relevance on humans". For workplaces where there is a risk of exposure to the hazardous concentrations of the vapours, continuous monitors for hydrogen peroxide should be used. Information on the hazards of hydrogen peroxide is available from OSHA and from the ATSDR.

Wound healing 
Historically, hydrogen peroxide was used for disinfecting wounds, partly because of its low cost and prompt availability compared to other antiseptics.

There is conflicting evidence on hydrogen peroxide's effect on wound healing. Some research finds benefit, while other research find delays and healing inhibition. Its use for home treatment of wounds is generally contraindicated.
1.5–3% Hydrogen peroxide is used as a desinfectant in dentistry, especially in endodotic treatments together with hypochlorite and chlorhexidin and 1–1.5% is also useful for treatment of inflammation of third molars (wisdom teeth).

Use in alternative medicine 
Practitioners of alternative medicine have advocated the use of hydrogen peroxide for various conditions, including emphysema, influenza, AIDS, and in particular cancer. There is no evidence of effectiveness and in some cases it has proved fatal.

Both the effectiveness and safety of hydrogen peroxide therapy is scientifically questionable. Hydrogen peroxide is produced by the immune system, but in a carefully controlled manner. Cells called phagocytes engulf pathogens and then use hydrogen peroxide to destroy them. The peroxide is toxic to both the cell and the pathogen and so is kept within a special compartment, called a phagosome. Free hydrogen peroxide will damage any tissue it encounters via oxidative stress, a process that also has been proposed as a cause of cancer.
Claims that hydrogen peroxide therapy increases cellular levels of oxygen have not been supported. The quantities administered would be expected to provide very little additional oxygen compared to that available from normal respiration. It is also difficult to raise the level of oxygen around cancer cells within a tumour, as the blood supply tends to be poor, a situation known as tumor hypoxia.

Large oral doses of hydrogen peroxide at a 3% concentration may cause irritation and blistering to the mouth, throat, and abdomen as well as abdominal pain, vomiting, and diarrhea. Ingestion of hydrogen peroxide at concentrations of 35% or higher has been implicated as the cause of numerous gas embolism events resulting in hospitalisation. In these cases, hyperbaric oxygen therapy was used to treat the embolisms.

Intravenous injection of hydrogen peroxide has been linked to several deaths.
The American Cancer Society states that "there is no scientific evidence that hydrogen peroxide is a safe, effective, or useful cancer treatment." Furthermore, the therapy is not approved by the U.S. FDA.

Historical incidents 
 On 16 July 1934, in Kummersdorf, Germany, a propellant tank containing an experimental monopropellant mixture consisting of hydrogen peroxide and ethanol exploded during a test, killing three people.
 During the Second World War, doctors in German concentration camps experimented with the use of hydrogen peroxide injections in the killing of human subjects.
 In April 1992, an explosion occurred at the hydrogen peroxide plant at Jarrie in France, due to technical failure of the computerised control system and resulting in one fatality and wide destruction of the plant.
 Several people received minor injuries after a hydrogen peroxide spill on board a flight between the U.S. cities of Orlando and Memphis on 28 October 1998.
 The Russian submarine K-141 Kursk sailed to perform an exercise of firing dummy torpedoes at the Pyotr Velikiy, a Kirov-class battlecruiser. On 12 August 2000, at 11:28 local time (07:28 UTC), there was an explosion while preparing to fire the torpedoes. The only credible report to date is that this was due to the failure and explosion of one of the Kursk's hydrogen peroxide-fueled torpedoes. It is believed that HTP, a form of highly concentrated hydrogen peroxide used as propellant for the torpedo, seeped through its container, damaged either by rust or in the loading procedure back on land where an incident involving one of the torpedoes accidentally touching ground went unreported. The vessel was lost with all hands. A similar incident was responsible for the loss of HMS Sidon in 1955.
The spill, which a spokesperson for the New York City fire department said was of hydrogen peroxide, shut down Broadway between West 42nd and West 48th streets as fire engines responded to the hazmat situation. There were no reported injuries.

See also 
 FOX reagent, used to measure levels of hydrogen peroxide in biological systems
 Hydrogen chalcogenide
 Retrobright, a process using hydrogen peroxide to restore yellowed Acrylonitrile butadiene styrene plastic

References 
Notes

Bibliography

 

External links 

 Hydrogen Peroxide at The Periodic Table of Videos (University of Nottingham)
 Material Safety Data Sheet
 ATSDR Agency for Toxic Substances and Disease Registry FAQ
 International Chemical Safety Card 0164
 NIOSH Pocket Guide to Chemical Hazards
 Process flow sheet of Hydrogen Peroxide Production by anthrahydroquinone autoxidation
 Hydrogen Peroxide Handbook by Rocketdyne
 IR spectroscopic study J. Phys. Chem.

 
Antiseptics
Bleaches
Disinfectants
1894 introductions
Household chemicals
Hydrogen compounds
Light-sensitive chemicals
Peroxides
Otologicals
Oxidizing agents
Rocket oxidizers
Hair coloring
Reactive oxygen species
Liquid explosives
Oxygen compounds